Thurston Harris (July 11, 1931 – April 14, 1990) was an American singer and songwriter, best known for his 1957 hit "Little Bitty Pretty One".

Career 
Harris first appeared on record in 1953. He was the vocalist for  South Central Los Angeles R&B band the Lamplighters. He remained with the band as it evolved through several name changes, from the Tenderfoots to the Sharps.

In 1957, Harris signed as a solo artist for Aladdin Records. His former band backed him when he released his version of Bobby Day's "Little Bitty Pretty One". It reached number 6 on the U.S. Billboard Hot 100. The track sold over one million records, achieving gold disc status. The Sharps would go on to another name change to become The Rivingtons, achieving fame with the single "Papa-Oom-Mow-Mow".

Unusually, "Little Bitty Pretty One" was released on three different-colored labels: purple, blue and maroon. The song appeared on the soundtracks to films or television dramas, such as Telling Lies in America, Matilda, Lipstick on Your Collar, and Christine.

Harris had a second and final hit in 1958 with "Do What You Did", which reached the Top 20. His other best known song was "Runk Bunk", recorded in 1959 (Aladdin 3452). Harris later recorded on Cub, Dot, Imperial, Intro, Reprise and United Artists.

Death
Harris died in his sleep of a heart attack on April 14, 1990.

Cover versions 
Frankie Lymon's highest charting solo hit was a cover of "Little Bitty Pretty One", which peaked at number 58 on the US Billboard R&B chart in 1960.
The Jackson 5 covered "Little Bitty Pretty One" on their 1972 album Lookin' Through the Windows.
 UK 1980's star Shakin' Stevens covered the wild rocker "Do What You Did" on his album, Take One, in 1980.
A cover of "Runk Bunk" was one of the first songs recorded by the UK pop star Adam Faith.
The Dave Clark 5 had a UK number 24 hit with "Little Bitty Pretty One" in 1965.

References

External links 
Complete discography of Thurston Harris
 

1931 births
1990 deaths
Cub Records artists
Imperial Records artists
Musicians from Indianapolis
20th-century American singers
20th-century American male singers